The Sangaldan Railway Tunnel  is a 7.1 km (4.4 mile) railway tunnel between Katra-Banihal section of Jammu–Baramulla line located to the north of Sangaldan town of middle Himalayas in Jammu and Kashmir, India near Ramban  district. The tunnel was completed on 4 December 2010.

Background and challenges
The tunnel has been constructed by Konkan Railway Corporation, a  subsidiary of the Indian Railways, as a part of its Udhampur-Srinagar-Baramulla rail link project.  The tunnel passes through strata of poor geology, consisting of Muree formation. The excavation was done using drill and blast method.  The construction phase was littered with tunnel collapses and slope failures.

See also
 Jammu–Baramulla line
 Pir Panjal Railway Tunnel

References

External links
 Sangaldhan Railway Tunnel  T80 By N.A.T.M at IRICEN

Railway tunnels in India
Buildings and structures in Jammu and Kashmir
Rail transport in Jammu and Kashmir

2011 establishments in Jammu and Kashmir
Ramban district
Tunnels completed in 2010